The International Journal of Multiphase Flow is a monthly peer-reviewed scientific journal covering fluid mechanics. The editors-in-chief are Alfredo Soldati (TU Wien) and S. Balachander (U Florida). The founding editor was Gad Hetsroni (Technion – Israel Institute of Technology). Previous editor (2007-2017) was Andrea Prosperetti (U Houston).

According to the Journal Citation Reports, the journal has a 2020 impact factor of 3.186.

References

External links 
 

Fluid dynamics journals
Publications established in 1973
Elsevier academic journals
Monthly journals
English-language journals